SubAudible Hum are an indie rock band based in Melbourne, Australia. Often compared to Radiohead they are active on the live circuit, particularly in their home town, they have released three albums, one of which was nominated for the J Award; In Time for Spring, On Came the Snow. and have received national airplay on Triple J.

History
Front man Daniel Griffith moved from Brisbane to Melbourne in 1999. Starting as an idea in 1999 he started put together a band called SubAudible Hum. The line-up consolidated around 2003 and in 2005 saw the release of their debut album; Everything You Heard Is True. Quickly following was their second album; In Time For Spring, On Came The Snow, which was met with critical acclaim.  Tall Stories, their third album, was released in 2009.

Discography

Studio albums

EPs

Awards and nominations

J Award
The J Awards are an annual series of Australian music awards that were established by the Australian Broadcasting Corporation's youth-focused radio station Triple J. They commenced in 2005.

|-
| 2006
|In Time for Spring, On Came The Snow
| Australian Album of the Year
|

References

Triple J – 'In Time For Spring, On Came The Snow' Music Review

Victoria (Australia) musical groups
Low Transit Industries artists